Spinitibia is a genus of moths in the family Autostichidae. It contains only one species, Spinitibia hodgesi, which is found in North America, where it has been recorded from Alabama, Arkansas, Florida, Georgia, Indiana, Kansas, Louisiana, Mississippi, Oklahoma, South Carolina, Tennessee and Virginia.

The length of the forewings is 5–8 mm. The ground colour of the forewings is yellowish white, with scattered dark brown scales except for longitudinal streaks of yellowish-white. The apical half of the costa and the areas between the veins at the outer margin have variable amounts of yellowish white. The hindwings are pale brownish grey. Adults have been recorded on wing from April to October.

Etymology
The genus name refers to the spiniform setae that are present on the hind tibia. The species name is a patronym for Ronald W. Hodges, who first recognized the species as being a new genus and species.

References

Symmocinae